Vahap is a Turkish given name for males. Notable people with the name include:

 Vahap Işık (born 1982), Turkish footballer
 Vahap Özaltay (1908–1965), Turkish footballer and coach
 Vahap Şanal (born 1998), Turkish chess grandmaster

Turkish masculine given names